In language learning, the principal parts of a verb are those forms that a student must memorize in order to be able to conjugate the verb through all its forms. The concept originates in the humanist Latin schools, where students learned verbs by chanting them in the four key forms from which all other forms can be deduced, for example:
fero - ferre - tuli - latum  ('to carry')

Not all languages have to be taught in this way. In French, for example, regular verbs can be deduced from a single form, the infinitive, and irregular verbs are too random to be systematized under fixed parts. But the concept can be carried over to many languages in which the verbs have some kind of "regular irregularity", i.e. irregularity always occurs at the same place in an otherwise regular system. 

Although the term 'principal part' is usually applied to verbs, the same phenomenon can be found in some languages in nouns and other word types. It is normally restricted to regular verbs, nouns, etc., and applies to languages where the regular paradigm is based on more than one underlying form. It does not cover random irregularities.

Classical languages

Latin 

In Latin, most verbs have four principal parts. For example, the verb for "to carry" is given as portō – portāre – portāvī – portātum, where portō is the first-person singular present active indicative ("I carry"), portāre is the present active infinitive ("to carry"), portāvī is the first-person singular perfect active indicative ("I carried"), and portātum is the neuter supine. Most of the verb forms in Latin derive from the first two principal parts: portābō, "I shall carry", is derived from the root portā-, taken from the present infinitive. However, all active perfect forms are derived from the third principal part (so portāveram, "I had carried", is taken from portāv-) while the perfect participle (portātus, portāta, portātum, "having been carried") is derived from the supine and is used to form the perfect passive participle with the auxiliary verb sum (such as portātum est, "it has been carried"). The auxiliary verb is often dropped when writing poetry in Latin.

For many Latin verbs, the principal parts are predictable: portō shown above uses a single stem, port-, and all principal parts are derived from them with the endings -ō – -āre – -āvī – -ātum. Others have more complicated forms: regō ("I rule") has the perfect form rēxī and perfect participle rēctum, derived as *reg-sī and *reg-tum. A handful of verbs, such as sum - esse - fuī - futūrum ("to be") are simply irregular.

A number of verbs have fewer than four principal parts: deponent verbs, such as hortŏr – hortāri – hortātus sum, "to exhort", lack a perfect form, as do semi-deponent verbs, such as audeō – audēre – ausus sum, "to dare"; in both cases, passive forms are treated as active, so all perfect forms are covered by the perfect participle. A handful of verbs are also defective, including the verb ōdī – ōdisse, "to hate", which only has perfect forms derived from a single stem.

Ancient Greek 

Verbs in Ancient Greek have six principal parts: present (I), future (II), aorist (III), perfect (IV), perfect middle (V) and aorist passive (VI), each listed in its first-person singular form:

Part I forms the entire present system, as well as the imperfect.
Part II forms the future tense in the active and middle voices.
Part III forms the aorist in the active and middle voices.
Part IV forms the perfect and pluperfect in the active voice, and the (exceedingly rare) future perfect, active.
Part V forms the perfect and pluperfect in the middle voice, and the (rare) future perfect, middle.
Part VI forms the aorist and future in the passive voice.

One principal part can sometimes be predicted from another, but not with any certainty. For some classes of verbs, however, all principal parts can be predicted given the first one.

Germanic languages

English 
Excluding four common irregular verbs, the principal parts of all other English verbs are the infinitive, preterite and past participle. All forms of these English verbs can be derived from the three principal parts. Four verbs have an unpredictable 3rd person singular form and the verb "to be" is so irregular it has seven separate forms. Lists or recitations of principal parts in English often omit the third principal part's auxiliary verb, rendering it identical to its grammatically distinct participial form. For example, the verb "to take" has the principal parts take–took–(have) taken. The verb "to bet" has bet–bet–(have) bet and the verb "to break" has break–broke–(have) broken. With irregular verbs the simple present 3S (he, she, it) is derived from infinitive+'s' with the exception of spelling changes such as: catch-catches, fly-flies and teach-teaches, which follow the same rules for regular 3S verbs.

Examples of irregular verbs and their principal parts

Regular verbs

Most verbs are regular enough that all forms can be derived directly from the infinitive. For example, the verb love derives all its forms systematically (love, loved, loving, has loved, loves), and since these can all be deduced from the basic form (the citation, dictionary, or lexicographic form, which in English is the bare infinitive), no other principal parts have to be learned. With irregular verbs like the verb sing, on the other hand, the forms sang and (have) sung cannot be deduced, so the learner of English must memorize three principal parts, sing–sang–(have) sung. The present 3S (he/she/it) is derived from the infinitive+'s' with the exception of verbs ending in a single -o, or ending in -s, -x, -z or the digraphs -sh, -ch, in which case it is derived from 'infinitive+es'. With three irregular verbs (and their derivatives) the 3S has to be learnt independently (e.g. has, does, undoes, redoes).

Highly irregular verbs

There are three verbs (and their derivatives) were three principal parts are insufficient to conjugate them fully having an irregular third person singular form in the present tense (in spelling and/or pronunciation).

To be
The verb "to be" is completely irregular having seven separate forms.

German 
The situation in German is very similar to English. Regular verbs require no memorizing of principal parts, since all forms can be deduced from the infinitive. However, some uncertainty may exist as to the choice of the perfect auxiliary, which could be haben ('to have') or sein ('to be'). This can be solved by memorizing the infinitive with the third-person singular perfect tense, which some teachers recommend.
tanzen - er hat getanzt

Strong verbs and irregular weak verbs are more complicated. As in English, these verbs are usually memorized by means of three principal parts: infinitive – third-person singular past tense – third-person singular perfect tense. 
singen - sang - gesungen  ('to sing' - a typical strong verb)
bringen - brachte - gebracht ('to bring' - an irregular weak verb)

However, in order to deduce the full paradigm, learners must also know the third-person singular present and the third-person singular past subjunctive, which involve some peculiarities. 

A small number of verbs have other irregularities, most of which are limited to the forms of the present tense.

Icelandic 
There are four types of principal parts in the Icelandic language, determined by the type of verb:

Weak verbs 
Icelandic weak verbs have the following principal parts:

It is possible to make the present subjunctive mood (þótt ég borði, "though I eat") from the first principal part (að borða, "to eat"). It is also possible to make the past subjunctive mood (þótt ég borðaði, "though I ate") from the second principal part (ég borðaði, "I ate").

In some other classes of weak verbs without 'a' as the thematic vowel, the present indicative singular undergoes more changes, but they are still to a large extent predictable.

Strong verbs 
Icelandic strong verbs have the following principal parts:

It is possible to make the present subjunctive mood (þótt ég finni, "though I find") from the first principal part (að finna, "to find"). It is also possible to make the past subjunctive mood (þótt ég fyndi, "though I found") from the third principal part (við fundum, "we found").

The present singular indicative in this class also undergoes more changes(i-umlaut, dental suffix assimilation etc.), which may let some verbs seem irregular at first glance. They are, however, mainly regular changes, like those in the weak verbs.

Preterite-present verb 
Icelandic Preterite-present verbs have the following principal parts:

It is possible to make the present subjunctive mood (þótt ég kunni, "though I knew") from the first principal part (að kunna, "to know"). It is also possible to make the past subjunctive mood (þótt ég kynni, "though I knew") from the third principal part (ég kunni, "I knew").

Ri-verbs 
Icelandic Ri-verbs have the following principal parts:

It is possible to make the present subjunctive mood (þótt ég snúi, "though I turn") from the first principal part (að snúa, "to turn"). It is also possible to make the past subjunctive mood (þótt ég sneri, "though I turned") from the second principal part (ég sneri, "I turned").

Others

Spanish 

Excluding a few highly irregular verbs, in Spanish, verbs are traditionally held to have only one principal part, the infinitive, by which one can classify the verb into one of three conjugation paradigms (according to the ending of the infinitive, which may be -ar, -er or -ir). However, some scholars believe that the conjugation could be regularized by adding another principal part to vowel-alternating verbs, which shows the alternation. For example, herir "to hurt" is usually considered irregular because its conjugation contains forms like hiero "I hurt", hieres "you hurt", where the vowel in the root changes into a diphthong. However, by including the first person singular, present tense, indicative mood form (hiero) as a principal part, and noting that the diphthong appears only when that syllable is stressed, the conjugation of herir becomes completely predictable.

French

Regular verbs are formed from a single principal part (the infinitive), and all conjugations  derive from this one principal part. A handful of verbs require spelling changes in which case it can be considered that these verbs technically have two or three principal parts depending on how many spelling changes need to be made. They include doubling a consonant, adding accent markers, adding the letter e, and converting letters for example y becoming i.

Seven principal parts

Irregular verbs are markedly more complicated, requiring seven principal parts of which few can be easily derived from the infinitive. For some verbs a few of their principal parts are identical with one another.

The paradigm goes as follows:

1 The -t is regularly dropped when directly following a d or t (e.g. il vend "he sells", not *il vendt).

Example with plaire

Verbs with 11 principal parts

A few highly irregular verbs require 11 principal parts to conjugate them fully. It includes all of the seven principal parts as well as a subjunctive form and different present participle forms, imperative forms and present-participle forms.

Fully irregular verbs

The verbs être, avoir and aller are so irregular they require even more than 11 principal parts.

Scottish Gaelic 
In Scottish Gaelic there are two principal parts for the regular verb: the imperative and the verbal noun, for example  –  'to kiss'. All finite forms can be deduced from the imperative  ('kiss!'), all non-finite forms from the verbal noun  ('kissing'). The ten irregular verbs can, with only two or three small aberrations (unexpected lenition), be deduced from four principal parts.

Ganda 
The principal parts of a Ganda verb are the imperative (identical to the verb stem), the first person singular of the present tense and the modified stem. For example, the verb okwogera 'to speak' has the principal parts yogera–njogera–yogedde.

The present tense, far past tense, near future tense, far future tense, subjunctive and infinitive are derived from the imperative. The present perfect, conditional and near past tense are derived from the modified stem.

In theory the second principal part can be derived from the first, but in practice this is so complicated that it is usually memorised as a separate principal part.

(See also Ganda verbs.)

See also 
Regular and irregular verbs
Grammatical conjugation
Latin conjugation
Root (linguistics)
Lemma (morphology)

References 

Units of linguistic morphology
Grammar